The Ak-Buura is a river in Kyrgyzstan and Uzbekistan. It flows through the city Osh, and discharges into the Shahrixonsoy, one of the canals of the Fergana Valley. The river is formed at the north slopes of Alai Mountains. The main settlements along the river Ak-Buura are the city Osh and the villages Tölöykön, Turuk and Papan.

References 

Rivers of Kyrgyzstan
Rivers of Uzbekistan